The Ecological Movement of Moldova is an environmental organization in Moldova.

Overview 

Ecological Movement of Moldova is a national, non-governmental, nonprofit organization formed on November 15, 1990. It has ten regional organizations and 15 affiliated organizations. MEM is a member of the International Union for Conservation of Nature. The movement is national representative of the Center "Naturopa" of the Council of Europe and United Nations Environment Programme of the United Nations. 

The newspaper of the organization is "Natura". The chairman of the Ecological Movement of Moldova is Alecu Reniță. In 1990 the movement had 70,000 members; in 1998, it had 10,000.

References

External links
 Mişcarea Ecologistă din Moldova 
 Mişcarea Ecologistă din Moldova anunţă despre încălcarea legislaţiei ecologice
 Miscarea Ecologista din Moldova, 15 ani de activitate 

Environmental organizations based in Moldova
Environmental organizations established in 1990
1990 establishments in the Moldavian Soviet Socialist Republic